Elections to Wigan Borough Council were held on 1 May 2003 with one-third of the council was up for election. Prior to the election, there had been two vacancies in Leigh Central, with Labour winning a by-election in June and the seat being fought in this election filled unopposed by Barbara Jarvis.

The election boasted a record number of candidates for an election of thirds, with 90 spread across all 24 wards. Whilst the Conservative's fielded a strong showing of all but three wards and the Lib Dems improved to fight half the wards, the bulk of the increase came from Community Action and the Socialist Alliance more than doubling their last year's totals, with the Socialist Alliance now contesting all but four wards and Community Action just under half. Labour reliably put up candidates for all wards, and the BNP a second candidate in Orrell.

Labour's share fell to under half of the votes for only the second time in the council's history, with the only other time being their low-point in 1975, with one of their lowest votes achieved. The main beneficiaries were the rapidly advancing Community Action Party, and to a lesser extent the Lib Dems, helping them to narrowly retain their third place in vote share behind the second place, and largely unchanged, Conservatives. The Socialist Alliance made little headway despite their near-full slate, and significantly fell back in their most competitive wards.

Labour lost five seats on the night, with each of three main competitors picking up seats. Community Action accounted for three, gaining further representation in Bryn and Lightshaw and also making another breakthrough in the formerly uninterrupted Labour territory of Ashton-Golborne. The Lib Dems picked up a seat in the historically competitive Aspull-Standish ward for the first time in over a decade, as well as comfortably defending their seat in Hindsford. The Tories strengthened their footing on the council with another gain in Swinley, a ward which had reliably elected Conservatives throughout the eighties, but had progressively been routed in the early nineties. This left Labour's majority at 58, the lowest in just under twenty years.  
  
Overall turnout dropped from last year's partly recovered figure of just over a quarter of the electorate, to 22.7%.

Election result

This result had the following consequences for the total number of seats on the Council after the elections:

Ward results

References

2003 English local elections
2003
2000s in Greater Manchester